Edoardo Colombo (born 24 January 2001) is an Italian-born Sanmarinese professional footballer, who plays as a goalkeeper for Arezzo.

Club career
Born in Ravenna, Colombo began his career at the youth academy of Cesena. In 2017, Colombo moved to Serie A side Juventus and joined their youth side. In 2018, Colombo went on loan to Carpi and in 2019 went on loan to Serie D side Torres 1903. During his time with Torres 1903, Colombo played in 25 matches.

On 18 August 2020, Colombo joined Serie C side Legnago Salus on loan. On 26 September 2020, he made his professional debut for the club against Vis Pesaro. He started as the match ended in a 2–2 draw.

On 13 January 2021, he moved to fellow Serie C club Fermana on a permanent basis. Having mainly served as the second-choice keeper behind Samuele Massolo, Colombo played his first and only game for Fermana on 2 May 2021, starting the match against his former club Legnago Salus as it ended in a 3-1 win for the latter team.

On 30 July 2021, Colombo permanently joined Arezzo, which had just got relegated to Serie D. He subsequently played his first match for the Tuscan side on 12 September, starting the match against Foligno in the preliminary round of the Coppa Italia Serie D: just moments before half-time, Colombo blocked a penalty from opponent striker Maurizio Peluso, who then slotted the rebound in the back of the net, scoring what would eventually be the only goal of the game.

International career
Despite being born in Italy, Colombo has represented San Marino internationally. at the  level.

On 17 November 2018, he made his debut for the national under-19 team against Scotland: he started the match, but couldn't prevent his side from a 5–0 defeat.

In August 2021, Colombo received his first call-up to the San Marino under-21 squad, and he subsequently made his debut on 2 September, starting the home match against Germany as his side eventually lost 6-0.

Career statistics

Club

References

2001 births
Living people
Sportspeople from Ravenna
Italian footballers
Sammarinese footballers
San Marino youth international footballers
Association football goalkeepers
Juventus F.C. players
S.E.F. Torres 1903 players
F.C. Legnago Salus players
Fermana F.C. players
S.S. Arezzo players
Serie D players
Serie C players
Footballers from Emilia-Romagna